Lights and Shadows is a 1988 Catalan Spanish fantasy film  written and directed by the Barcelonan director, Jaime Camino.

The film was entered into the main competition at the 45th edition of the Venice Film Festival. For her performance, Ángela Molina was nominated for best actress at the 3rd Goya Awards.

Plot

Cast
 José Luis Gómez as Diego de Velazquez
 Jack Shepherd as Teo
 Ángela Molina as Charo
 Fermi Reixach as King Felipe IV
 Martí Galindo
 Víctor Rubio
 María Mercader

References

External links
 

1988 fantasy films
Spanish fantasy films
Films directed by Jaime Camino
Films about time travel
1980s Spanish films